Gracie's Sea Hag is a seafood restaurant in Depoe Bay, Oregon, United States.

Description 

In 2016, Michael Russell of The Oregonian called Gracie's Sea Hag "a long-standing seafood dive". Outside the restaurant is a state of a sea hag and her husband. Popular among locals and tourists, Gracie's Sea Hag is reportedly haunted.

History 
Gracie Strom opened the restaurant in 1963. Clary and Jerome Grant owned Gracies Sea Hag, as of 2019.

Reception 
Michael Russell of The Oregonian included Gracie's Sea Hag in a 2016 overview of recommended eateries along the Oregon Coast and said the restaurant had "surprisingly good grub". Matthew Korfhage included Gracie's Sea Hag in Willamette Week's 2016 list of "The Best 10 Clam Chowders on the Oregon Coast, From Astoria to Yachats". In 2019, The Oregonian's Jamie Hale said Gracie's Sea Hag was "one of the most beloved establishments on the central Oregon coast". She also included the restaurant in a 2020 list of "20 reasons to love Depoe Bay". In 2022, Margaret Seiler included Gracie's Sea Hag in Portland Monthly list of "12 Essential Oregon Coast Bars". She wrote, "Sit under a mermaid portrait, try the famous buttery clam chowder, listen to a musician sitting at a piano but strumming a guitar, and catch the regular percussion show when the bartender plays the liquor bottles."

See also 

 List of reportedly haunted locations in the United States

References

External links 

 Official website
 Visit Gracie’s Sea Hag, A Local Dining Favorite In Depoe Bay! (May 4, 2022), Oregon Beach Magazine
 Gracie's Sea Hag Restaurant & Lounge at Zomato

1963 establishments in Oregon
Lincoln County, Oregon
Restaurants established in 1963
Seafood restaurants in Oregon